In mathematics, finitely presented may refer to:
 finitely presented group
 finitely presented monoid
 finitely presented module
 finitely presented algebra
 finitely presented scheme, a global version of a finitely presented algebra

See also finitely generated (disambiguation).